La Femme Nikita Original Soundtrack is the soundtrack album series for the television series.

Track listing

 Mark Snow – "Main Title"
 Enigma – "Beyond the Invisible"
 Mono – "Silicone"
 Depeche Mode – "The Love Thieves"
 Morcheeba – "Fear and Love"
 Hednoize – "Loaded Gun"
 DJ Krush featuring Deborah Anderson – "Skin Against Skin"
 Beverly Klass – "Temple"
 Afro Celt Sound System – "Inion/Daughter"
 Curve – "Chinese Burn"
 Vibrolux – "Drown"
 Morphine – "Hanging on a Curtain"
 Fluke – "Absurd"
 Gus Gus – "Gun"
 DJ Keoki – "Majick" (Cirrus Remix)

Television soundtracks
1998 soundtrack albums